Tüsheet Khan (Mongolian: Түшээт хан) refers to the territory as well as the Chingizid dynastic rulers of the Tüsheet Khanate, one of four Khalka khanates that emerged from remnants of the Mongol Empire after the death of Dayan Khan's son Gersenji in 1549 and which continued until 1930.

Through most of the 17th century, the Tüsheet Khan, along with the Setsen Khan, comprised two Left Wing (or Left Flank) Khalkha Mongol khanates situated in central and eastern areas of present-day Mongolia with the Jasaghtu Khan and the Altan Khan comprising the two Right Wing (western) khanates.  The Altan Khan ceased to exist after a series of defeats at the hands of their western neighbors the Oirat Dzungar Khanate in the late 17 century. The Tüsheet Khan often exerted more influence and power over the other Khans as it occupied most of modern central Mongolia,  an area that included the Orkhon Valley, the ancient Mongol capital of Karakorum, and the religious center of Erdene Zuu.

The 3rd Dalai Lama declared Abtai (1554 - 1588), grandson of Gersenji, Khan of the Tüsheet following their meeting at Guihua (present day Hohhot) in 1587.  In the years leading up to the meeting, Abtai had converted to Buddhism and founded Erdene Zuu, one of Mongolia's first Buddhist monasteries, near the ruins of Karakorum.  Following his meeting with the Dalai Lama, Abtai declared Tibetan Buddhism the state religion of his khanate.  Zanabazar, the first  Jebtsundamba Khutuktu (Tibetan Buddhist spiritual leader of Khalkha Mongols) was the son of Tüsheet khan Gombodorj (1594-1655) and the great grandson of Abtai Sain Khan.  His migratory palace, the Örgöö, would eventually settle in the location of Mongolia's present day capital Ulaanbaatar.

In 1691, the leaders of the Tüsheet Khan, the Jasaghtu Khan, and the Setsen Khan fled to Inner Mongolia where they pledged fealty to the Kangxi Emperor of the Qing dynasty in return for protection against the invading Dzungar (western) Mongolian forces under Galdan Boshugtu Khan.  After the Qing's victory over the Dzungars at the Battle of Jao Modo in 1697, the three khanates became provincial subdivisions or aimags of the Manchus and their respective khans were made nominal leaders.  In 1725, the Qing created a fourth aimag, Sain Noyon Khan Aimag, carved out of 19 khoshuu (sub-districts) in western Tüsheet Khan Aimag.  In 1930, following the Mongolian Revolution of 1921, the four aimags were divided into the present day 21 smaller aimags, which were subdivided into sums.

Tüsheet Khans

 Gersenji Khongtaiji of the Jalayir (1513-1549)
 Onokhui üizen noyan (1549-1554)
 Abtai Sain Khan (1554-1586)
 Erkhi Mergen Khan (1586-1636)
 Gombodorj (1636-1655)
 Chikhundorj (1655-1698)
 Dondubdorj (1698-1701)
 Ravdandorj (1701-1710)
 Vandildorj (1710-1734)
 Togtokhdorj (1734-1742)
 Tubdandorj (1742-1746)
 Jampildorj (1746-1760)
 Tsedendorj (1760-1795 and 1795-1815)
 Minjurdorj 1795
 Oidubdorj (1815-1828)
 Erentei (1828-1830)
 Tserendorj (1830-1863)
 Nasantsogt (1863-1900)
 Dashyam (1900-1912)
 Dorjsuren Khoroljav (1912-1922)

References

Northern Yuan dynasty
Mongolia under Qing rule
Former countries in Chinese history
Mongolia (1911–1924)
Khanates
Khans